Pterotricha is a genus of ground spiders that was first described by Władysław Kulczyński in 1903.

Species
 it contains forty-four species:
Pterotricha aethiopica (L. Koch, 1875) – Ethiopia
Pterotricha algerica Dalmas, 1921 – Algeria, Libya
Pterotricha arabica Zamani, 2018 – United Arab Emirates
Pterotricha arcifera (Simon, 1882) – Yemen
Pterotricha argentosa Charitonov, 1946 – Uzbekistan
Pterotricha arzhantsevi Fomichev, Marusik & Koponen, 2018 – Iraq
Pterotricha auris (Tucker, 1923) – South Africa
Pterotricha cambridgei (L. Koch, 1872) – Syria, Israel
Pterotricha chazaliae (Simon, 1895) – Morocco, Mauritania, Algeria, Israel
Pterotricha conspersa (O. Pickard-Cambridge, 1872) – Libya, Egypt, Israel
Pterotricha dalmasi Fage, 1929 – Algeria, Egypt, Sudan, Israel, Jordan, Saudi Arabia, United Arab Emirates, Iran?
Pterotricha djibutensis Dalmas, 1921 – Somalia
Pterotricha egens Denis, 1966 – Libya
Pterotricha engediensis Levy, 1995 – Israel
Pterotricha esyunini Zamani, 2018 – United Arab Emirates
Pterotricha insolita Dalmas, 1921 – Algeria
Pterotricha kochi (O. Pickard-Cambridge, 1872) – Turkey, Lebanon, Syria, Israel
Pterotricha kovblyuki Zamani & Marusik, 2018 – United Arab Emirates, Iran
Pterotricha lentiginosa (C. L. Koch, 1837) (type) – Balkans, Greece, Turkey, Ukraine
Pterotricha lesserti Dalmas, 1921 – Turkey, Egypt, Israel, Saudi Arabia
Pterotricha levantina Levy, 1995 – Israel
Pterotricha linnaei (Audouin, 1826) – Egypt
Pterotricha lutata (O. Pickard-Cambridge, 1872) – Lebanon, Israel
Pterotricha marginalis (Tucker, 1923) – South Africa
Pterotricha mauritanica Denis, 1945 – Mauritania
Pterotricha montana Zamani & Marusik, 2018 – Iran
Pterotricha nadolnyi Zamani, 2018 – United Arab Emirates
Pterotricha nomas (Thorell, 1875) – Russia (Europe)
Pterotricha parasyriaca Levy, 1995 – Israel
Pterotricha paupercula Denis, 1966 – Libya
Pterotricha pavlovskyi Spassky, 1952 – Tajikistan
Pterotricha procera (O. Pickard-Cambridge, 1874) – Egypt, Israel
Pterotricha pseudoparasyriaca Nuruyeva & Huseynov, 2016 – Azerbaijan, Iran
Pterotricha punctifera Dalmas, 1921 – Yemen
Pterotricha quagga (Pavesi, 1884) – Ethiopia
Pterotricha saga (Dönitz & Strand, 1906) – Japan
Pterotricha schaefferi (Audouin, 1826) – Libya, Egypt, Sudan, Israel
Pterotricha simoni Dalmas, 1921 – Spain
Pterotricha sinoniae Caporiacco, 1953 – Italy
Pterotricha somaliensis Dalmas, 1921 – Somalia
Pterotricha stevensi Zamani, 2018 – United Arab Emirates
Pterotricha strandi Spassky, 1936 – Iran, Turkmenistan, Afghanistan, India
Pterotricha syriaca Dalmas, 1921 – Syria
Pterotricha vicina Dalmas, 1921 – Algeria, Libya

References

Araneomorphae genera
Gnaphosidae
Spiders of Africa
Spiders of Asia